Oberleutnant Erich Hahn (18 October 1891 – 4 September 1917) was a World War I flying ace credited with six aerial victories.

Biography
Erich Hahn was born on 18 October 1891 in Leipzig, the Kingdom of Saxony, in the German Empire.

He joined Saxony's Infantry Regiment Nr. 2 just before World War I. In 1913, he learned to fly at Anthony Fokker's flying school. As one of the very few experienced pilots about, he was serving in Flieger-Abteilung (Flier Detachment) 64 when the war began. He then moved on to service in Flieger-Abteilung (Flier Detachment) 23 and then to artillery direction with Flieger-Abteilung (Artillerie) (Flier Detachment (Artillery)) 221.

On 10 August 1916, he transferred to fighter aviation with his assignment to Kampfeinsitzerkommando (Combat Single-Seater Command) Bertincourtt. When Jagdstaffel 1 (Fighter Squadron 1) was founded as one of the original dedicated German fighter squadrons later in August, Hahn joined them. On 10 November, he would both succeed to acting squadron commander and score his first aerial victory. On 29 November 1916, he transferred to command of Jagdstaffel 19 (Fighter Squadron 19). Having already won both classes of the Iron Cross, he accepted the Knight's Cross of the Military Order of Saint Henry on 29 December 1916. Hahn was the first fighter pilot to receive the Saint Henry.

He would not score again until April, when he downed three enemy airplanes and two observation balloons. Notable among these wins was his fourth victory, when he downed French ace René Doumer. On 1 May, Erich Hahn was awarded the Royal House Order of Hohenzollern.

After these six confirmed victories, Hahn led his squadron until 1935 hours 4 September 1917. At that time, French ace, Lieutenant Georges Madon shot him down over Beine, France and killed him.

Sources of information

References
 Franks, Norman; Bailey, Frank W.; Guest, Russell. Above the Lines: The Aces and Fighter Units of the German Air Service, Naval Air Service and Flanders Marine Corps, 1914–1918. Grub Street, 1993. , .

1891 births
1917 deaths
German World War I flying aces
Military personnel from Leipzig
People from the Kingdom of Saxony
Luftstreitkräfte personnel
German military personnel killed in World War I
Aviators killed by being shot down